Jérôme Rey (born 19 May 1995) is a French rugby union player, who plays for Lyon OU. He also is a farmer in Saint-Vital, a commune located in the Tarentaise Valley of his native Savoie.

He was first called to the French national team in February 2022, for the following Six Nations Championship. He was a regular member of the French squad during the tournament, whilst still yet to earn his first cap.

References

External link
All.rugby profile

1995 births
Sportspeople from Albertville
Living people
French rugby union players
Rugby union props
CS Bourgoin-Jallieu players
FC Grenoble players
Lyon OU players
French farmers